Acral fibrokeratoma (also known as an "Acquired digital fibrokeratoma," and "Acquired periungual fibrokeratoma") is a skin lesion characterized by a pinkish, hyperkeratotic, hornlike projection occurring on a finger, toe, or palm.

See also 
 Skin lesion
 List of cutaneous conditions

References 

Dermal and subcutaneous growths
Conditions of the skin appendages